Uwe Hardter (born 14 January 1977 in Tübingen) is a German former professional cyclist. He rode in the 2003 Giro d'Italia, finishing 64th overall.

Major results
2002
 7th GP Triberg-Schwarzwald
2006
 7th Overall Tour of Indonesia

References

1977 births
Living people
German male cyclists
Sportspeople from Tübingen
Cyclists from Baden-Württemberg